L'Impromptu de la garnison de Namur is a Belgian play. It was first published in 1692.

It was anonymously composed in the Spanish Netherlands, after the surrender of Namur to French troops in June 1692. It was reviewed by Florent Carton Dancourt, and played at the Comédie-Française on 26 July 1692, under the name L'Impromptu garnison.

References

External links

"Repertoire Chronologique des Spectacles a Paris 1673-1715 "

Belgian plays
1692 plays
Plays set in the 17th century
Plays set in Belgium
Nine Years' War
Works published anonymously